Mayo South was a parliamentary constituency represented in Dáil Éireann, the lower house of the Irish parliament or Oireachtas from 1923 to 1969. The method of election was proportional representation by means of the single transferable vote (PR-STV).

History
The constituency was created under the Electoral Act 1923 for the 1923 general election to Dáil Éireann, whose members formed the 4th Dáil.

From 1923 to 1948, Mayo South elected 5 deputies (Teachtaí Dála, commonly known as TDs). Under the Electoral (Amendment) Act 1947, this was reduced to 4 with effect from the 1948 general election.

It was abolished under the Electoral (Amendment) Act 1969, when it and Mayo North were replaced by the two new constituencies of Mayo East and Mayo West.

Boundaries
The constituency covered the county electoral areas of Castlebar, Claremorris and Westport, in the administrative county of Mayo.

TDs

Elections

1965 general election

1961 general election

1957 general election

1954 general election

1951 general election

1948 general election

1945 by-election
Following the resignation of Fianna Fáil TD Micheál Clery, a by-election was held on 4 December 1945. The seat was won by the Clann na Talmhan candidate Bernard Commons

1944 general election

1943 general election

1938 general election

1937 general election

1933 general election

1932 general election

September 1927 general election

June 1927 general election

1923 general election

See also
Dáil constituencies
Politics of the Republic of Ireland
Historic Dáil constituencies
Elections in the Republic of Ireland

References

External links
Oireachtas Members Database

Historic constituencies in County Mayo
Dáil constituencies in the Republic of Ireland (historic)
1923 establishments in Ireland
1969 disestablishments in Ireland
Constituencies established in 1923
Constituencies disestablished in 1969